Countdown to Shutdown is a 1984 video game published by Creative Sparks.

Gameplay
Countdown to Shutdown is a game in which the player directs robots in an underground energy plant to cool its overheating core.

Reception
Gregg Williams reviewed the game for Computer Gaming World, and stated that "Overall, I like the Apple version of Countdown, and I'm sure the C-64 version is even more enjoyable. If you ever get the game completely solved, you can play a randomized version that will keep you busy for a while longer."

References

External links
Review in Ahoy!
Review in Family Computing
Review (as "Meltdown") in Computer and Video Games

1984 video games
Action-adventure games
Apple II games
Commodore 64 games
Nuclear accidents in fiction
Video games about robots
Video games developed in the United Kingdom